The Ring magazine was established in 1922 and has named a Knockout of the Year since 1989, based on the magazine's writers' criteria.

Knockouts of the Year by decade

1980s
 1989:  Michael Nunn KO 1  Sumbu Kalambay

1990s
 1990:  Terry Norris KO 1  John Mugabi
 1991: no award was given
 1992:  Morris East KO 11  Akinobu Hiranaka... tie:  Kennedy McKinney KO 11  Welcome Ncita
 1993:  Gerald McClellan TKO 5  Julian Jackson
 1994:  George Foreman KO 10  Michael Moorersee Michael Moorer vs. George Foreman
 1995:  Julio César Vásquez KO 11  Carl Daniels
 1996:  Wilfredo Vázquez KO 11  Eloy Rojas
 1997:  Arturo Gatti KO 5  Gabriel Ruelas
 1998:  Roy Jones Jr. KO 4  Virgil Hill
 1999:  Derrick Jefferson KO 6  Maurice Harris

2000s
 2000:  Ben Tackie KO 10  Robert Garcia
 2001:  Lennox Lewis KO 4  Hasim Rahmansee Hasim Rahman vs. Lennox Lewis II
 2002:  Lennox Lewis KO 8  Mike Tysonsee Lennox Lewis vs. Mike Tyson
 2003:  Rocky Juarez KO 10  Antonio Diaz
 2004:  Antonio Tarver KO 2  Roy Jones Jr.see Roy Jones Jr. vs. Antonio Tarver II
 2005:  Allan Green KO 1  Jaidon Codrington
 2006:  Calvin Brock KO 6  Zuri Lawrence
 2007:  Nonito Donaire KO 5  Vic Darchinyan
 2008:  Edison Miranda KO 3  David Banks
 2009:  Manny Pacquiao KO 2  Ricky Hattonsee Ricky Hatton vs. Manny Pacquiao

2010s
 2010:  Sergio Martínez KO 2  Paul Williamssee Sergio Martínez vs. Paul Williams II
 2011:  Nonito Donaire KO 2  Fernando Montielsee Fernando Montiel vs. Nonito Donaire
 2012:  Juan Manuel Márquez KO 6  Manny Pacquiaosee Manny Pacquiao vs. Juan Manuel Márquez IV
 2013:  Adonis Stevenson TKO 1  Chad Dawson
 2014:   Carl Froch KO 8  George Grovessee Carl Froch vs. George Groves II
 2015:  Canelo Álvarez KO 3  James Kirkland
 2016:  Canelo Álvarez KO 6  Amir Khansee Canelo Álvarez vs. Amir Khan
 2017:  David Lemieux KO 3  Curtis Stevens
 2018:  Naoya Inoue KO 1  Juan Carlos Payano
 2019:  Deontay Wilder KO 7  Luis Ortizsee Deontay Wilder vs. Luis Ortiz II

2020s
 2020:  Gervonta Davis KO 6  Léo Santa Cruz
 2021:  Gabriel Rosado KO 3  Bektemir Melikuziev
 2022:  Leigh Wood TKO 12  Michael Conlan

See also

 The Ring magazine Fight of the Year
 The Ring magazine Fighter of the Year
 BWAA Fighter of the Year

References

External links
 

Boxing awards
Knockouts of the year